Winfield High School is a high school located on the banks of the Kanawha River in Winfield, West Virginia. The community is a rural town, located halfway between Huntington and Charleston, and the school is in Putnam County Schools.

Winfield High School is the newest of the four high schools in Putnam County. The school mascot is The General and official school colors are Green and White, with Black also commonly used. The school yearly houses about 850 students.

The current building opened in 1980, prior to that what is currently Winfield Middle School housed students in grades 6-12. Winfield High underwent major expansion in 2006 to compensate for the extreme overcrowding of the school and to update many of the facilities. The 6 million dollar project was completed in the fall of 2007. A New Additional Gymnasium and Updates of the various seating were finished in 2012. After several years at the Class AA, Winfield was reclassified as a Class AAA school by the WVSSAC in the fall of 2008. Winfield also competed as a Class A school until the late 60's, giving them the unusual distinction of being a member of all three classes during their history. Winfield is a member of the Mountain State Athletic Conference (MSAC).

The Facility and Mascot were both named after, Brevet Lt. General Winfield Scott, (The Longest General in U.S. History & National Hero) of the United States Army from the War of 1812, Mexican War (captured Mexico City and became Military Governor), Black Hawk War, the Second Seminole War, Ran for President against Franklin Pierce in 1852, and the offense and Defensive Strategy for the Union Briefly in the Beginning of the Civil War (The Anaconda Plan) to defend the capital, Secure the North, invade the south, cut off the supply lines of the Mississippi River to blockade the west from Mexico, Texas, and the Indian Territories, and Devised the Defensive Naval Blockade against the South and Great Britain

History
Gil McClanahan of WCHS-TV stated that administrators at Winfield High had touted their "atmosphere of inclusion", and Mcclanahan stated that there was "unique culture among faculty, staff and students".

School demographics
The most recent statistics indicate that Winfield High School student body consists of the following racial/ethnic demographics:

95% White <2% Black <3% Other

Awards and recognition for academics
In 2009 Winfield was honored by Business Week as being the top Academic School in West Virginia

WV Exemplary School - 2002, 2003, 2004, 2005, 2006, 2007, 2008, 2009, 2010
School of Excellence - 1993-1994, 2003–2004, 2006–2007
WV Blue Ribbon School - 1996
National Blue Ribbon School - 1996

State championships
Baseball Class AA (1985, 2001, 2002)
Boys' Basketball Class AA(2004)
Girls' Basketball Class AA (2004, 2006)
Cheerleading Class AA (2003, 2018)
Football Class A (1960, 1961, 1963) Class AA (1985, 1987)
Boys' Golf Class AA (2004)
Girls' Soccer One Class Only (1995, 1996, 1997) Class AAA (2012, 2013, 2014, 2015) Class AA/A (2016)
Boys' Soccer "Class AA" (2018)
Girls' Swimming One Class Only (2010)
Boys' Track and Field Class AA/A(1997, 1998) Class AA (2004, 2005, 2006, 2007, 2008, 2017, 2019, 2022)
Girls' Track and Field Class AA/A (1998) Class AA (2003, 2004, 2005, 2007, 2008, 2017, 2019, 2021, 2022) Class AAA (2015,2016)
Girls' Volleyball Class AA (2006) 
Girls' Cross Country Class AA (2017, 2018, 2021) 
Boys' Cross Country Class AA (2021)
Boys' Tennis Class AA/A (2018)
Girls' Tennis Class AA/A'' (2017, 2018)

Notable teachers 
Virginia Mae Brown, set many "first woman" records.

References

External links
 

Public high schools in West Virginia
Schools in Putnam County, West Virginia